The Paul J. Gutman Library is the main library of Thomas Jefferson University, which is located in the East Falls section of Philadelphia, Pennsylvania. The Gutman Library opened in 1992 to replace the university's Pastore Library (now the Architecture & Design School). The architectural firm of Shepley Bulfinch was responsible for the building's design. In 1993, the library won the Louis I. Kahn Award for best-designed academic building from American School and University, a national publication for educational institutions.

Historical background

Construction of the library, which opened October 10, 1992, was made possible by a donation by Alvin C. and Mary Bert Gutman in memory of their son, Paul J. Gutman. Paul J. Gutman died on September 25, 1990, in an airplane accident while on a business trip for Pressman-Gutman, the Bala-Cynwyd, Pennsylvania, textile converting company founded by his great-grandfather, Harry J. Pressman.

Paul's grandfather, Jacob C. Gutman (1890-1981), president of Pressman-Gutman, and four of his Gutman granduncles graduated from the university at the turn of the 20th century when it was Philadelphia Textile School. His granduncles were members of E. Gutman and Sons, the textile firm founded in 1889 by their father, J. Barnett Gutman (1861-1934).

Karen Albert is currently director of the Paul J. Gutman Library at Thomas Jefferson University. She succeeded the library's inaugural director, Stephen J. Bell, in 2007.

Resources

The Paul J. Gutman Library contains 54,000-square-foot and seats 400. Its design combines a traditional book-and-journal collection with an extensive electronic environment. Through its website, the library delivers a wide range of information resources to members of the University community on and off campus. Electronic resources include: Avery Index to Architectural Periodicals, Art Index, EBSCO, S&P’s NetLibrary, Hoover's, LexisNexis, ProQuest, MD Consult, JSTOR Stylesight, and many more. These online databases and electronic book, newspaper, and journal collections offer students convenient 24/7 research and study access to a continually-expanding world of knowledge and information.

The availability of electronic resources, including 42,000 online journals, supplements a book collection of more than 150,000 volumes, with special emphasis in the areas of art and architecture, design, textiles, sciences, and business. The Gutman Library Special Collections Department maintains one of the largest collections in the United States devoted to the history of the textile industry. A contemporary reading collection of best-sellers and popular materials is also available. Other print publications include 450 current journal, trade, and newspapers subscriptions. Materials not available in the Gutman Library collection can be obtained through an interlibrary loan network linking more than 14,000 libraries around the world, or through EZBorrow, a self-service loan system for books from over 50 of Pennsylvania's largest academic libraries.

Building features

The Paul J. Gutman Library building contains individual study carrels, seven group study rooms, and student lounge areas. To help students become effective and efficient researchers, librarians work with faculty to educate students about the resources available and the most effective ways of accessing and using them. Classroom presentations and one-on-one hands-on instruction are aimed at creating an information-literate student body.

The Library has rooms for quiet study and group discussion: six group study rooms accommodating two to six people are equipped with tables, chairs, and power outlets; two rooms, 101 and 214, are equipped with plasma screens for projection from laptops.

Computers and computer accessories

The Paul J. Gutman Library is outfitted with nearly one hundred PCs and Macs for individual or collaborative work. Microsoft Office Suite and other software programs are pre-loaded on these machines. Wireless laptops and iPads may also be rented at the circulation desk. Wireless access in Gutman allows students to use personal or library-provided laptops or iPads at any location in the building. 
    
Black and white printers are located on all floors of the library, and one color printer may be found on the lower level near the Media Services Desk.  Each student may print 500 free, double-sided black-and-white sheets per semester.  To print in color or exceed the 500 sheet semester limit, cash or a university debit card must be used.

Scanners are located throughout the building, attached to several of the computers. Scanners are compatible with and connected to both PCs and Macintosh computers, allowing users to save digital images to their home directory for use in projects or for printing to black and white or color printers.

References

External links
 

Library buildings completed in 1992
Libraries in Philadelphia
Buildings and structures in Philadelphia